Lawrence Robert Comley (August 17, 1939 – January 21, 2006) was an American professional basketball player. Comley was selected in the 1961 NBA draft by the Chicago Packers after a collegiate career at Kansas State. He played for the Baltimore Bullets in the 1963–64 season and appeared in 12 total games.

References

1939 births
2006 deaths
American men's basketball players
Baltimore Bullets (1963–1973) players
Basketball players from Kansas
Chicago Packers draft picks
Guards (basketball)
Kansas City Steers players
Kansas State Wildcats men's basketball players
Sportspeople from Kansas City, Kansas
Wilmington Blue Bombers players